Concepción Department is a  department of Corrientes Province in Argentina.

Settlements
Colonia Santa Rosa
Concepción
Tabay
Tatacuá

See also
Concepción Department (Paraguay)

Departments of Corrientes Province